Brittney Spencer (born September 8, 1988) is an American country singer–songwriter. Spencer received notable attention following a viral Twitter video showing Spencer singing a cover of song by The Highwomen. The video drew praise from fellow country artists and prompted the release of her first extended play (EP) titled Compassion (2020). She has also released several singles, including 2021's "Sober & Skinny". Spencer has since performed on the Country Music Association Awards and has embarked on a world tour.

Early life
Spencer is a native of Baltimore, Maryland. She developed an interest in music from singing in church. "Church, for me, was very cultural. It’s spiritual, but also very cultural. Families like mine, we couldn’t really afford singing lessons or anything like that, so I just sang in the church all the time," she told Baltimore magazine. She was raised as an African Methodist Episcopal. Spencer also came from a musical family. Her father was part of a quartet band. A friend from church got Spencer interested in The Chicks, which developed her interest in country music. From there, she developed interest in artists like Taylor Swift. She attended magnet schools in her teen years, including the George Washington Carver Center for Arts and Technology. During this time she learned to play guitar and piano. Spencer also took vocal lessons from a coach who taught her how to sing in a recording studio. She began by singing background vocals for R&B and gospel artists including Jason Nelson. In February 2013, Spencer moved to Nashville, Tennessee to pursue country music full-time.

Career
After moving to Nashville, Spencer attended Middle Tennessee State University. While attending the university she worked as a vocal coach in a program dedicated to students from low-income homes. She also found work as a background singer and eventually toured with Christopher Cross and Carrie Underwood. She also performed in clubs and other performance venues in the Nashville area. Despite performance opportunities, Spencer found it difficult pursuing country music as an overweight and black performer. "Being a Black woman in Nashville can be challenging when it comes time to book someone to do all sorts of things related to fashion, whether it’s glam or wardrobe. I do feel that systemic or societal pressure at times, but I also feel really empowered," she told Glamour.

It was in 2020, that Spencer received notable attention after posting a cover of The Highwomen's "Crowded Table" on Twitter. The video received more than 150,000 views and re-tweeted by Maren Morris and Amanda Shires who praised Spencer's performance. "I just love to sing and write songs. Though there’s really no way I could have ever prepared for the most humbling experience of my life to take place on Twitter," she told Billboard. In 2020, Spencer released her debut extended play (EP) titled Compassion. The project included several songs including "Damn Right, You're Wrong" and "My Perfect Life". During this time, she also launched her first tour titled "In a Perfect World". In June 2021, Spencer released a new single called "Sober & Skinny". In late 2021, Spencer performed alongside Mickey Guyton and Madeline Edwards on the 55th Annual Country Music Association Awards. The trio sang a track off Guyton's Remember Her Name album called "Love My Hair". She is expecting to her release her first full-length album in 2022. Spencer is expected to perform on the upcoming 57th Academy of Country Music Awards. In March 2022 she was nominated by the CMT Music Awards, her first award from a major industry.

In November 2022, Spencer signed a major label recording contract with Elektra Records. An extended play was released the following day, featuring original material and a cover of The Chicks's "Cowboy Take Me Away".

Musical style and influences
Spencer told American Songwriter that her musical style is diverse because of the different artists and songwriters she is influenced by: "I feel like I have a really wide stretch of what influences me, which is probably why it still made my songs sound so different." In describing her musical style, Marcus K. Dowling explained that Spencer combines a "thundering power of her talent blended with highly engaging songs". She credits Beyoncé, Ray Charles, Miranda Lambert and Jazmine Sullivan as influences on her artistry.

Discography

Extended plays

Singles

Other album appearances

Music videos

Awards and nominations

!
|-
| rowspan=2|2022
| CMT Music Awards
| CMT Digital First Performance of the Year – "Sober & Skinny"
| 
| align="center"| 
|-
| Americana Music Honors & Awards
| Emerging Artist of the Year
| 
| align="center"| 
|}

References

External links
 Official website

1988 births
21st-century American singers
21st-century American women singers
American women country singers
African-American women singer-songwriters
African-American country musicians
American country singer-songwriters
Country musicians from Maryland
Living people
People from Baltimore
Singer-songwriters from Maryland